The 1997 Grand Prix Hassan II was a men's tennis tournament played on outdoor clay courts at the Complexe Al Amal in Casablanca, Morocco and was part of the World Series of the 1997 ATP Tour. It was the 13th edition of the tournament and was held from 24 March through 30 March 1997. Second-seeded Hicham Arazi won the singles title.

Finals

Singles

 Hicham Arazi defeated  Franco Squillari 3–6, 6–1, 6–2
 It was Arazi's only singles title of his career.

Doubles

 João Cunha e Silva /  Nuno Marques defeated  Karim Alami /  Hicham Arazi 7–6, 6–2
 It was Cunha e Silva's only title of the year and the 2nd of his career. It was Marques's only title of the year and the 1st of his career.

References

External links
 Official website 
 ATP tournament profile

 
Grand Prix Hassan II
Grand Prix Hassan II